Pentalenolactone synthase (Formerly , penM (gene), pntM (gene)) is an enzyme with systematic name pentalenolactone-F:oxidized-ferredoxin oxidoreductase (pentalenolactone forming). This enzyme catalyse the following chemical reaction

 pentalenolactone F + oxidized ferredoxin  pentalenolactone + reduced ferredoxin

This is heme-thiolate protein (P-450), which is isolated from the bacteria Streptomyces exfoliatus and Streptomyces arenae.

References

External links 
 

EC 1.14.19